"Bart Has Two Mommies" is the fourteenth episode of the seventeenth season of the American animated television series The Simpsons. It originally aired on the Fox network in the United States on March 19, 2006. In the episode, Marge babysits for Flanders' sons while Bart is kidnapped by a chimpanzee.

Plot
The Simpson family attend a church fundraiser for a new steeple. Ned Flanders wins a rubber duck racing contest and is awarded a computer, although he gives it to Marge because he does not have any use for it. Marge babysits Rod and Todd to repay the favor. She finds that all the games they play are boring and overly safe, such as a "sitting still contest," and helps Rod and Todd have fun by encouraging them to liven up.

With Marge spending so much time at the Flanders' house, Homer, Bart, and Lisa go to an animal sanctuary for retired film animals. Bart sees an elderly female chimpanzee named Toot-Toot and offers her some ice cream, only to be taken into her cage and "adopted." Ned comes home and sees Todd wearing a Band-Aid, having injured himself during one of Marge's games. Marge encourages Ned to let his kids start taking more risks, showing him a flyer for a child-safe activity center.

Marge takes Rod and Todd to the activity center. Ned follows her and is surprised to see Rod climbing a structure, yelling that he will get hurt. Rod gets worried and falls, chipping a tooth against the structure. A news broadcast plays about Bart's kidnapping, surprising Marge and causing Ned to view her as a bad mother. Following this, he starts child-proofing the house, although Rod and Todd protest and tell him that they liked having Marge over.

Lisa suggests that Toot-Toot is keeping Bart captive because her real son has gone missing. When Marge goes into the cage to talk to Toot-Toot, she escapes and climbs atop the unfinished church steeple. With Toot-Toot's son, Mr. Teeny, Rod climbs up the steeple and Ned encourages him. Toot-Toot happily reunites with Mr. Teeny and lets Bart go. In a mid-credits scene, Maude Flanders looks down from Heaven, proud that Rod is growing up.

Cultural references
The episode title refers to the book Heather Has Two Mommies.

Left-handed pitcher Randy Johnson makes a cameo appearance at the Left-Handed convention selling his own line of left-handed teddy bears.

Ned sings "Welcome to the Jungle" by Guns N' Roses with alternate lyrics as "Welcome to the Jungle Gym" while child-proofing the backyard.

Ned makes a reference to the Led Zeppelin song "Dazed and Confused" when he says, "Call me Ned Zeppelin, but is one of my boys abrased and contused?" after he discovers a Band-Aid wrapper in the living room.

Reverend Lovejoy's obsession with building a spire to "compensate for [his] own sense of smallness" is a reference to The Spire by William Golding.

See also

References

External links 

 

The Simpsons (season 17) episodes
2006 American television episodes